The Washington Nationals' 2011 season was the seventh season for the American baseball franchise of Major League Baseball in the District of Columbia and the 43rd since the original team was started in Montreal, Quebec, Canada. It involved the Nationals attempting to win the National League East Division after a 69–93 season the year before.

On June 23, 2011, manager Jim Riggleman resigned after contract disputes with general manager Mike Rizzo. Riggleman resigned following a 1–0 win over the Seattle Mariners which put the Nationals over .500 at the latest point in a season since 2005 and gave them their 11th win in 12 games. Riggleman compiled a 140–172 record with the Nationals after he replaced Manny Acta after the all-star break in 2009. On June 24, Davey Johnson was named the new manager. Previously, he was a senior advisor to Mike Rizzo. He began managing on June 27. Bench coach John McLaren managed the club for three games following Riggleman's resignation before Johnson was decided upon as interim manager.

The Nationals finished the 2011 season in third place in the NL East with an 80–81 record, playing only 161 games because one game against the Los Angeles Dodgers was canceled due to rain. Their third-place finish was their best finish in the standings and second-best win–loss record since they moved to Washington.

Offseason
The Nationals formed a new minor league affiliation with the Auburn Doubledays of the New York–Penn League during the winter. The player development contract was officially announced December 14, 2010.

On December 16, 2010, the Nationals traded Josh Willingham to the Oakland Athletics for Corey Brown and Henry Rodríguez. On January 19, 2011, they traded minor-leaguers Michael Burgess, Graham Hicks, and A. J. Morris to the Chicago Cubs for Tom Gorzelanny. On February 2, 2011, they traded Justin Maxwell to the New York Yankees for minor-leaguer for Adam Olbrychowski. On March 27, 2011, they traded Nyjer Morgan to the Milwaukee Brewers for minor-leaguer Cutter Dykstra and cash, and the following day they traded Alberto González to the San Diego Padres for Erik Davis.

Advertising and marketing
The Nationals′ marketing slogan for 2011 was "Expect It." According to a letter to season ticket holders signed by Nationals Chief Operating Officer Andrew Feffer explained that the slogan let Nationals fans know that the team's rebuilding strategy "is beginning to show returns," and that "we are determined to continue to do what it takes to elevate the franchise to the next level." The letter added that "in 2010, we had a productive stable of veterans and stars in the lineup," that "we now have a solid and exciting pipeline of pitchers," and that the franchise's "improved Minor League system is now regularly producing a steady stream of Major League talent."

New Radio Flagship
Starting with this season, the Nationals changed their flagship station to WJFK-FM (106.7 The Fan), after broadcasting their first six seasons on WTOP 104.1 FM.

Spring training
The Nationals held their 2011 spring training in Viera, Florida, with home games played at Space Coast Stadium.

Regular season

Season standings

National League East

Record vs. opponents

Opening Day lineup

Notable transactions 
December 5, 2010: The Nationals sign free-agent outfielder Jayson Werth to a 7-year, $126M contract.
May 8, 2011: The Nationals received Gregor Blanco from the Kansas City Royals as part of a conditional deal.
June 27, 2011: The Nationals sold Miguel Pérez to the Pittsburgh Pirates.
July 26, 2011: The Nationals traded minor-leaguers Chris Manno and Bill Rhinehart to the Cincinnati Reds for Jonny Gomes and cash.
July 30, 2011: The Nationals traded Jason Marquis to the Arizona Diamondbacks for minor-leaguer Zach Walters and Jerry Hairston Jr., to the Milwaukee Brewers for minor-leaguer Erik Komatsu.
August 9, 2011: The Nationals purchased Miguel Pérez from the Pittsburgh Pirates.

Draft
The 2011 Major League Baseball First-Year Player Draft took place from June 6 to June 8. With their first pick – the sixth pick overall – the Nationals selected third baseman Anthony Rendon. Other notable players the Nationals selected were pitcher Alex Meyer (first round compensation pick, 23rd pick overall), pitcher Taylor Hill (sixth round, 187th overall), and outfielder Billy Burns (32nd round, 967th overall).

Roster

Attendance
The Nationals drew 1,940,478 fans at Nationals Park in 2011, improving over the previous season for the second straight year. It placed them 14th in attendance for the season among the 16 National League teams, also for the second consecutive year. Their highest attendance at a home game was on August 20, when they drew 44,685 for a game against the Philadelphia Phillies, while their lowest was 13,413 for a game against the Phillies on April 12. Their average home attendance was 24,256 per game, fifth-highest of their seven seasons in Washington but an increase from their previous season.

Game log

|- align="center" bgcolor="ffbbbb"
| 1 || March 31 || Braves || 2–0  || Lowe (1–0) || Hernández (0–1) || Kimbrel (1) || 39,055 || 0–1
|-

|- align="center" bgcolor="bbffbb" 
| 2 || April 2 || Braves || 6–3  || Lannan (1–0) || Hanson (0–1) || Burnett (1) || 21,941 || 1–1
|- align="center" bgcolor="ffbbbb"
| 3 || April 3 || Braves || 11 – 2 || Hudson (1–0) || Zimmermann (0–1) || || 22,210 || 1–2
|- align="center" bgcolor="ffbbbb"
| 4 || April 5 || @ Marlins || 3–2  (10) || Mujica (1–0) || Storen (0–1) || || 10,482 || 1–3
|- align="center" bgcolor="ffbbbb"
| 5 || April 6 || @ Marlins || 7–4  || Sanches (1–0) || Gaudin (0–1) || Oviedo (1) || 13,825 || 1–4
|- align="center" bgcolor="bbffbb"
| 6 || April 7 || @ Marlins || 5–3  (11) || Coffey (1–0) || Mujica (1–1) || Burnett (2) || 10,696 || 2–4
|- align="center" bgcolor="bbffbb"
| 7 || April 8 || @ Mets || 6–2  || Zimmermann (1–1) || Dickey (1–1) || || 41,075 || 3–4
|- align="center" bgcolor="ffbbbb"
| 8 || April 9 || @ Mets || 8–4  || Capuano (1–0) || Gorzelanny (0–1) || Rodríguez (1) || 31,696 || 3–5
|- align="center" bgcolor="bbffbb"
| 9 || April 10 || @ Mets || 7–3  (11) || Storen (1–1) || Boyer (0–2) || || 35,157 || 4–5
|- align="center" bgcolor="bbffbb"
| 10 || April 12 || Phillies || 7–4  || Hernández (1–1) || Blanton (0–1) || Burnett (3) || 13,413 || 5–5
|- align="center" bgcolor="ffbbbb"
| 11 || April 13 || Phillies || 3–2  || Halladay (2–0) || Lannan (1–1) || || 16,914 || 5–6
|- align="center" bgcolor="ffbbbb"
| 12 || April 14 || Phillies || 4–0  || Lee (2–1) || Zimmermann (1–2) || || 24,875 || 5–7
|- align="center" bgcolor="bbffbb"
| 13 || April 15 || Brewers || 4–3  (10) || Gaudin (1–1) || Braddock (0–1) || || 17,217 || 6–7
|- align="center" bgcolor="bbbbbb"
| – || April 16 || Brewers || colspan=6| Postponed (rain) Rescheduled for April 17 as part of a doubleheader
|- align="center" bgcolor="bbffbb"
| 14 || April 17 (1) || Brewers || 8–4  || Marquis (1–0) || Gallardo (1–1) || || rowspan=2| 23,047 || 7–7
|- align="center" bgcolor="bbffbb"
| 15 || April 17 (2) || Brewers || 5–1  || Hernández (2–1) || Loe (1–1) || Storen (1) || 8–7
|- align="center" bgcolor="bbbbbb"
| – || April 19 || @ Cardinals || colspan=6| Postponed (rain) Rescheduled for April 20 as part of a doubleheader
|- align="center" bgcolor="bbffbb"
| 16 || April 20 (1) || @ Cardinals || 8–6  || Lannan (2–1) || Westbrook (1–2) || Storen (2) || 32,340 || 9–7
|- align="center" bgcolor="ffbbbb"
| 17 || April 20 (2) || @ Cardinals || 5–3  || García (3–0) || Zimmermann (1–3) || Boggs (1) || 33,714 || 9–8
|- align="center" bgcolor="ffbbbb"
| 18 || April 21 || @ Cardinals || 5–0  || Lohse (3–1) || Gorzelanny (0–2) || || 36,160 || 9–9
|- align="center" bgcolor="bbbbbb"
| – || April 22 || @ Pirates || colspan=6| Postponed (rain) Rescheduled for April 25
|- align="center" bgcolor="ffbbbb"
| 19 || April 23 || @ Pirates || 7–2  || Karstens (2–0) || Hernández (2–2) || || 18,262 || 9–10
|- align="center" bgcolor="bbffbb"
| 20 || April 24 || @ Pirates || 6–3  || Marquis (2–0) || Correia (3–2) || Storen (3) || 9,520 || 10–10
|- align="center" bgcolor="ffbbbb"
| 21 || April 25 || @ Pirates || 4–2  || Maholm (1–3) || Lannan (2–2) || Hanrahan (6) || 12,457 || 10–11
|- align="center" bgcolor="ffbbbb"
| 22 || April 26 || Mets || 6–4  || Igarashi (1–0) || Zimmermann (1–4) || Rodríguez (5) || 14,603 || 10–12
|- align="center" bgcolor="ffbbbb"
| 23 || April 27 || Mets || 6–3  || Beato (1–0) || Burnett (0–1) || Rodríguez (6) || 13,568 || 10–13
|- align="center" bgcolor="bbffbb"
| 24 || April 28 || Mets || 4–3  || Hernández (3–2) || Capuano (2–2) || Storen (4) || 15,142 || 11–13
|- align="center" bgcolor="bbffbb"
| 25 || April 29 || Giants || 3–0  || Marquis (3–0) || Lincecum (2–3) || || 21,399 || 12–13
|- align="center" bgcolor="ffbbbb"
| 26 || April 30 || Giants || 2–1  || Mota (2–0) || Lannan (2–3) || Wilson (8) || 28,766 || 12–14
|-

|- align="center" bgcolor="bbffbb"
| 27 || May 1 || Giants || 5–2  || Zimmermann (2–4) || Cain (2–2) || Storen (5) || 21,611 || 13–14
|- align="center" bgcolor="bbffbb"
| 28 || May 2 || Giants || 2–0  || Gorzelanny (1–2) || Bumgarner (0–5) || Storen (6) || 15,342 || 14–14
|- align="center" bgcolor="ffbbbb"
| 29 || May 3 || @ Phillies || 4–1  || Hamels (4–1) || Hernández (3–3) || || 45,695 || 14–15
|- align="center" bgcolor="ffbbbb"
| 30 || May 4 || @ Phillies || 7–4  || Worley (2–0) || Marquis (3–1) || || 44,123 || 14–16
|- align="center" bgcolor="ffbbbb"
| 31 || May 5 || @ Phillies || 7–3  || Halladay (5–1) || Lannan (2–4) || || 45,316 || 14–17
|- align="center" bgcolor="bbffbb"
| 32 || May 6 || @ Marlins || 3–2  (10) || Storen (2–1) || Dunn (2–2) || Burnett (4) || 15,325 || 15–17
|- align="center" bgcolor="bbffbb"
| 33 || May 7 || @ Marlins || 5–2  || Gorzelanny (2–2) || Volstad (2–2) || Storen (7) || 17,409 || 16–17
|- align="center" bgcolor="ffbbbb"
| 34 || May 8 || @ Marlins || 8–0  || Sánchez (2–1) || Hernández (3–4) || || 10,523 || 16–18
|- align="center" bgcolor="bbffbb"
| 35 || May 10 || @ Braves || 7–6  || Marquis (4–1) || Hudson (4–3) || Storen (8) || 16,143 || 17–18
|- align="center" bgcolor="bbffbb"
| 36 || May 11 || @ Braves || 7–3  (11) || Storen (3–1) || Linebrink (0–1) || || 16,692 || 18–18
|- align="center" bgcolor="ffbbbb"
| 37 || May 12 || @ Braves || 6–5  (10) || Kimbrel (1–1) || Slaten (0–1) || || 19,758 || 18–19
|- align="center" bgcolor="ffbbbb"
| 38 || May 13 || Marlins || 6–5  (11) || Mujica (4–1) || Broderick  (0–1) || Oviedo (13) || 19,503 || 18–20
|- align="center" bgcolor="ffbbbb"
| 39 || May 14 || Marlins || 1–0  || Sánchez (3–1) || Hernández (3–5) || Oviedo (14) || 22,497 || 18–21
|- align="center" bgcolor="bbffbb"
| 40 || May 15 || Marlins || 8–4  || Marquis (5–1) || Vázquez (2–4) || || 18,356 || 19–21
|- align="center" bgcolor="bbffbb"
| 41 || May 16 || Pirates || 4–2  || Kimball (1–0) || Maholm (1–6) || Storen (9) || 21,960 || 20–21
|- align="center" bgcolor="bbbbbb"
| – || May 17 || Pirates || colspan=6| Postponed (rain) Rescheduled for July 2 as part of a doubleheader
|- align="center" bgcolor="ffbbbb"
| 42 || May 18 || @ Mets || 3–0  || Niese (3–4) || Gorzelanny (2–3) || Rodríguez (13) || 24,527 || 20–22
|- align="center" bgcolor="ffbbbb"
| 43 || May 19 || @ Mets || 1–0  || Gee (3–0) || Hernández (3–6) || Rodríguez (14) || 26,835 || 20–23
|- align="center" bgcolor="bbffbb"
| 44 || May 20 || @ Orioles || 17 – 5 || Rodríguez (1–0) || Arrieta (5–2) || || 24,442 || 21–23
|- align="center" bgcolor="ffbbbb"
| 45 || May 21 || @ Orioles || 8–3  || Guthrie (2–6) || Lannan (2–5) || || 33,107 || 21–24
|- align="center" bgcolor="ffbbbb"
| 46 || May 22 || @ Orioles || 2–1  || Johnson (3–1) || Zimmermann (2–5) || Gregg (8) || 33,626 || 21–25
|- align="center" bgcolor="ffbbbb"
| 47 || May 23 || @ Brewers || 11 – 3 || Gallardo (6–2) || Gorzelanny (2–4) || || 22,906 || 21–26
|- align="center" bgcolor="ffbbbb"
| 48 || May 24 || @ Brewers || 7–6  || McClendon (2–0) || Rodríguez (1–1) || Axford (13) || 24,722 || 21–27
|- align="center" bgcolor="ffbbbb"
| 49 || May 25 || @ Brewers || 6–4  || Greinke (3–1) || Marquis (5–2) || Loe (1) || 34,419 || 21–28
|- align="center" bgcolor="bbffbb"
| 50 || May 27 || Padres || 2–1  || Storen (4–1) || Adams (2–1) || || 21,024 || 22–28
|- align="center" bgcolor="ffbbbb"
| 51 || May 28 || Padres || 2–1  || Stauffer (1–3) || Zimmermann (2–6) || Bell (11) || 19,159 || 22–29
|- align="center" bgcolor="ffbbbb"
| 52 || May 29 || Padres || 5–4  || Gregerson (2–1) || Storen (4–2) || Bell (12) || 23,169 || 22–30
|- align="center" bgcolor="ffbbbb"
| 53 || May 30 || Phillies || 5–4  || Halladay (7–3) || Burnett (0–2) || Madson (12) || 34,789 || 22–31
|- align="center" bgcolor="bbffbb"
| 54 || May 31 || Phillies || 10 – 2 || Marquis (6–2) || Lee (4–5) || || 21,017 || 23–31
|-

|- align="center" bgcolor="bbffbb"
| 55 || June 1 || Phillies || 2–1  || Lannan (3–5) || Oswalt (3–3) || Storen (10) || 24,495 || 24–31
|- align="center" bgcolor="bbffbb"
| 56 || June 2 || @ Diamondbacks || 6–1  || Zimmermann (3–6) || Duke (1–1) || Storen (11) || 17,810 || 25–31
|- align="center" bgcolor="ffbbbb"
| 57 || June 3 || @ Diamondbacks || 4–0  || Collmenter (4–1) || Maya (0–1) || || 20,332 || 25–32
|- align="center" bgcolor="ffbbbb"
| 58 || June 4 || @ Diamondbacks || 2–0  || Saunders (3–5) || Hernández (3–7) || Putz (17) || 26,199 || 25–33
|- align="center" bgcolor="bbffbb"
| 59 || June 5 || @ Diamondbacks || 9–4  (11) || Burnett (1–2) || Paterson (0–1) || || 23,129 || 26–33
|- align="center" bgcolor="ffbbbb"
| 60 || June 6 || @ Giants || 5–4  (13) || López (3–1) || Stammen (0–1) || || 41,180 || 26–34
|- align="center" bgcolor="bbffbb"
| 61 || June 7 || @ Giants || 2–1  || Zimmermann (4–6) || Sánchez (4–4) || Storen (12) || 41,786 || 27–34
|- align="center" bgcolor="ffbbbb"
| 62 || June 8 || @ Giants || 3–1  || Cain (5–4) || Burnett (1–3) || || 41,738 || 27–35
|- align="center" bgcolor="ffbbbb"
| 63 || June 9 || @ Padres || 7–3  || Harang (7–2) || Hernández (3–8) || || 16,464 || 27–36
|- align="center" bgcolor="bbffbb"
| 64 || June 10 || @ Padres || 2–1  || Marquis (7–2) || Latos (4–7) || Storen (13) || 23,211 || 28–36
|- align="center" bgcolor="bbffbb"
| 65 || June 11 || @ Padres || 2–1  || Lannan (4–5) || Richard (2–8) || Storen (14) || 25,027 || 29–36
|- align="center" bgcolor="bbffbb"
| 66 || June 12 || @ Padres || 2–0  || Coffey (2–0) || Bell (2–3) || Storen (15) || 20,185 || 30–36
|- align="center" bgcolor="bbffbb"
| 67 || June 14 || Cardinals || 8–6  || Rodríguez (2–1) || Batista (3–2) || Storen (16) || 26,739 || 31–36
|- align="center" bgcolor="bbffbb"
| 68 || June 15 || Cardinals || 10 – 0 || Hernández (4–8) || McClellan (6–3) || || 27,130 || 32–36
|- align="center" bgcolor="bbffbb"
| 69 || June 16 || Cardinals || 7–4  (10) || Burnett (2–3) || Salas (3–1) || || 19,662 || 33–36
|- align="center" bgcolor="bbffbb"
| 70 || June 17 || Orioles || 8–4  || Burnett (3–3) || Accardo (3–3) || || 35,562 || 34–36
|- align="center" bgcolor="bbffbb"
| 71 || June 18 || Orioles || 4–2  || Zimmermann (5–6) || Matusz (1–2) || Storen (17) || 36,614 || 35–36
|- align="center" bgcolor="ffbbbb"
| 72 || June 19 || Orioles || 7–4  || Jakubauskas (2–0) || Gorzelanny (2–5) || || 35,439 || 35–37
|- align="center" bgcolor="bbffbb"
| 73 || June 21 || Mariners || 6–5  || Coffey (3–0) || Pauley (4–1) || || 21,502 || 36–37
|- align="center" bgcolor="bbffbb"
| 74 || June 22 || Mariners || 2–1  || Lannan (5–5) || Bédard (4–5) || Storen (18) || 21,367 || 37–37
|- align="center" bgcolor="bbffbb"
| 75 || June 23 || Mariners || 1–0  || Clippard (1–0) || Ray (3–2) || || 21,161 || 38–37
|- align="center" bgcolor="bbffbb"
| 76 || June 24 || @ White Sox || 9–5  (14) || Balester (1–0) || Thornton (0–4) || || 23,856 || 39–37
|- align="center" bgcolor="ffbbbb"
| 77 || June 25 || @ White Sox || 3–0  || Peavy (4–1) || Gorzelanny (2–6) || Santos (15) || 23,008 || 39–38
|- align="center" bgcolor="bbffbb"
| 78 || June 26 || @ White Sox || 2–1  || Hernández (5–8) || Humber (7–4) || Storen (19) || 24,057 || 40–38
|- align="center" bgcolor="ffbbbb"
| 79 || June 27 || @ Angels || 4–3  (10) || Downs (5–2) || Burnett (3–4) || || 35,032 || 40–39
|- align="center" bgcolor="ffbbbb"
| 80 || June 28 || @ Angels || 11 – 5 || Takahashi (2–1) || Balester (1–1) || || 41,029 || 40–40
|- align="center" bgcolor="ffbbbb"
| 81 || June 29 || @ Angels || 1–0  || Haren (8–5) || Zimmermann (5–7) || Walden (18) || 35,257 || 40–41
|-

|- align="center" bgcolor="bbffbb"
| 82 || July 1 || Pirates || 2–1  || Storen (5–2) || Wood (0–3) || || 22,399 || 41–41
|- align="center" bgcolor="ffbbbb"
| 83 || July 2 (1) || Pirates || 5–3  || Veras (2–2) || Burnett (3–5) || Hanrahan (24) || rowspan=2| 39,638 || 41–42
|- align="center" bgcolor="bbffbb"
| 84 || July 2 (2) || Pirates || 4–3  || Mattheus (1–0) || Watson (0–1) || Storen (20) || 42–42
|- align="center" bgcolor="ffbbbb"
| 85 || July 3 || Pirates || 10 – 2 || Correia (11–6) || Marquis (7–3) || || 23,522 || 42–43
|- align="center" bgcolor="bbffbb"
| 86 || July 4 || Cubs || 5–4  (10) || Rodríguez (3–1) || Mateo (1–2) || || 32,937 || 43–43
|- align="center" bgcolor="bbffbb"
| 87 || July 5 || Cubs || 3–2  || Detwiler (1–0) || Ortiz (0–1) || Storen (21) || 19,181 || 44–43
|- align="center" bgcolor="bbffbb"
| 88 || July 6 || Cubs || 5–4  || Mattheus (2–0) || Wood (1–4) || Storen (22) || 19,631 || 45–43
|- align="center" bgcolor="ffbbbb"
| 89 || July 7 || Cubs || 10 – 9 || Marshall (5–2) || Rodríguez (3–2) || Mármol (18) || 22,016 || 45–44
|- align="center" bgcolor="ffbbbb"
| 90 || July 8 || Rockies || 3–2  || Hammel (5–8) || Lannan (5–6) || Street (25) || 19,046 || 45–45
|- align="center" bgcolor="ffbbbb"
| 91 || July 9 || Rockies || 2–1  || Jiménez (4–8) || Marquis (7–4) || Street (26) || 29,441 || 45–46
|- align="center" bgcolor="bbffbb"
| 92 || July 10 || Rockies || 2–0  || Zimmermann (6–7) || Chacín (8–7) || Storen (23) || 21,186 || 46–46
|- style="text-align:center; background:#bbb;"
|colspan=9| All–Star Break (July 11–14)
|- align="center" bgcolor="ffbbbb"
| 93 || July 15 || @ Braves || 11 – 1 || Hudson (9–6) || Hernández (5–9) || || 34,106 || 46–47
|- align="center" bgcolor="bbffbb"
| 94 || July 16 || @ Braves || 5–2  || Lannan (6–6) || Hanson (10–5) || Storen (24) || 42,456 || 47–47
|- align="center" bgcolor="ffbbbb"
| 95 || July 17 || @ Braves || 9–8  || Kimbrel (3–2) || Mattheus (2–1) || || 30,314 || 47–48
|- align="center" bgcolor="bbffbb"
| 96 || July 18 || @ Astros || 5–2  || Marquis (8–4) || Lyles (0–5) || Storen (25) || 28,975 || 48–48
|- align="center" bgcolor="ffbbbb"
| 97 || July 19 || @ Astros || 7–6  || Happ (4–11) || Zimmermann (6–8) || Melançon (8) || 32,418 || 48–49
|- align="center" bgcolor="ffbbbb"
| 98 || July 20 || @ Astros || 3–2  (11) || López (2–4) || Coffey (3–1) || || 29,605 || 48–50
|- align="center" bgcolor="bbffbb"
| 99 || July 22 || @ Dodgers || 7–2  || Lannan (7–6) || Kuroda (6–12) || || 39,839 || 49–50
|- align="center" bgcolor="ffbbbb"
| 100 || July 23 || @ Dodgers || 7–6  || Guerra (2–0) || Mattheus (2–2) || || 34,590 || 49–51
|- align="center" bgcolor="ffbbbb"
| 101 || July 24 || @ Dodgers || 3–1  || Billingsley (9–8) || Marquis (8–5) || Guerra (7) || 36,458 || 49–52
|- align="center" bgcolor="ffbbbb"
| 102 || July 26 || Marlins || 11 – 2 || Nolasco (7–7) || Zimmermann (6–9) || || 24,650 || 49–53
|- align="center" bgcolor="ffbbbb"
| 103 || July 27 || Marlins || 7–5  || Vázquez (7–9) || Hernández (5–10) || Oviedo (29) || 21,974 || 49–54
|- align="center" bgcolor="ffbbbb"
| 104 || July 28 || Marlins || 5–2  || Sanches (4–1) || Lannan (7–7) || || 24,153 || 49–55
|- align="center" bgcolor="ffbbbb"
| 105 || July 29 || Mets || 8–5  || Gee (10–3) || Wang (0–1) || Isringhausen (5) || 30,114 || 49–56
|- align="center" bgcolor="bbffbb"
| 106 || July 30 || Mets || 3–0  || Maya (1–1) || Dickey (5–9) || Storen (26) || 35,414 || 50–56
|- align="center" bgcolor="bbffbb"
| 107 || July 31 || Mets || 3–2  || Storen (6–2) || Parnell (3–3) || || 25,307 || 51–56
|-

|- align="center" bgcolor="bbffbb"
| 108 || August 1 || Braves || 5–3  || Hernández (6–10) || Jurrjens (12–4) || Storen (27) || 19,940 || 52–56
|- align="center" bgcolor="bbffbb"
| 109 || August 2 || Braves || 9–3  || Lannan (8–7) || Lowe (6–10) || || 24,326 || 53–56
|- align="center" bgcolor="ffbbbb"
| 110 || August 3 || Braves || 6–4  || Beachy (5–2) || Wang (0–2) || Kimbrel (32) || 20,043 || 53–57
|- align="center" bgcolor="ffbbbb"
| 111 || August 4 || @ Rockies || 6–3  || Rogers (5–1) || Detwiler (1–1) || || 35,956 || 53–58
|- align="center" bgcolor="bbffbb"
| 112 || August 5 || @ Rockies || 5–3  || Zimmermann (7–9) || Nicasio (4–4) || Storen (28) || 35,034 || 54–58
|- align="center" bgcolor="ffbbbb"
| 113 || August 6 || @ Rockies || 15 – 7 || Chacín (9–8) || Hernández (6–11) || || 43,321 || 54–59
|- align="center" bgcolor="bbffbb"
| 114 || August 7 || @ Rockies || 3–2  || Clippard (2–0) || Bélisle (5–4) || Storen (29) || 34,812 || 55–59
|- align="center" bgcolor="bbbbbb"
| – || August 8 || @ Cubs || colspan=6| Postponed (rain) Rescheduled for August 11
|- align="center" bgcolor="bbffbb"
| 115 || August 9 || @ Cubs || 3–1  || Wang (1–2) || Garza (5–9) || Storen (30) || 37,109 || 56–59
|- align="center" bgcolor="ffbbbb"
| 116 || August 10 || @ Cubs || 4–2  || López (3–3) || Detwiler (1–2) || Mármol (25) || 38,010 || 56–60
|- align="center" bgcolor="ffbbbb"
| 117 || August 11 || @ Cubs || 4–3  || Dempster (10–8) || Zimmermann (7–10) || Mármol (26) || 34,733 || 56–61
|- align="center" bgcolor="bbffbb"
| 118 || August 12 || @ Phillies || 4–2  || Hernández (7–11) || Hamels (13–7) || Storen (31) || 45,762 || 57–61
|- align="center" bgcolor="ffbbbb"
| 119 || August 13 || @ Phillies || 11 – 3 || Oswalt (5–7) || Lannan (8–8) || || 45,570 || 57–62
|- align="center" bgcolor="bbbbbb"
| – || August 14 || @ Phillies || colspan=6| Postponed (rain) Rescheduled for September 20 as part of a doubleheader
|- align="center" bgcolor="bbffbb"
| 120 || August 16 || Reds || 6–4  || Wang (2–2) || Leake (10–8) || Storen (32) || 23,888 || 58–62
|- align="center" bgcolor="ffbbbb"
| 121 || August 17 || Reds || 2–1  || Cueto (9–5) || Detwiler (1–3) || Cordero (24) || 20,374 || 58–63
|- align="center" bgcolor="bbffbb"
| 122 || August 18 || Reds || 3–1  || Zimmermann (8–10) || Arroyo (7–10) || Storen (33) || 19,508 || 59–63
|- align="center" bgcolor="bbffbb"
| 123 || August 19 || Phillies || 8–4  || Coffey (4–1) || Madson (3–2) || || 37,841 || 60–63
|- align="center" bgcolor="ffbbbb"
| 124 || August 20 || Phillies || 5–0  || Oswalt (6–7) || Lannan (8–9) || || 44,685 || 60–64
|- align="center" bgcolor="bbffbb"
| 125 || August 21 || Phillies || 5–4  (10) || Burnett (4–5) || Lidge (0–1) || || 41,727 || 61–64
|- align="center" bgcolor="bbffbb"
| 126 || August 22 || Diamondbacks || 4–1  || Detwiler (2–3) || Saunders (8–11) || Storen (34) || 19,377 || 62–64
|- align="center" bgcolor="ffbbbb"
| 127 || August 23 || Diamondbacks || 2–0  || Kennedy (16–4) || Zimmermann (8–11) || Putz (31) || 17,029 || 62–65
|- align="center" bgcolor="ffbbbb"
| 128 || August 24 || Diamondbacks || 4–2  || Hudson (13–9) || Hernández (7–12) || Putz (32) || 17,881 || 62–66
|- align="center" bgcolor="ffbbbb"
| 129 || August 25 || Diamondbacks || 8–1  || Miley (1–1) || Lannan (8–10) || || 17,666 || 62–67
|- align="center" bgcolor="ffbbbb"
| 130 || August 26 || @ Reds || 4–3  || Cordero (5–3) || Balester (1–2) || || 35,089 || 62–68
|- align="center" bgcolor="ffbbbb"
| 131 || August 27 || @ Reds || 6–3  || Leake (11–8) || Detwiler (2–4) || Cordero (29) || 30,423 || 62–69
|- align="center" bgcolor="ffbbbb"
| 132 || August 28 || @ Reds || 5–4  (14) || Bray (4–2) || Balester (1–3) || || 28,415 || 62–70
|- align="center" bgcolor="bbffbb"
| 133 || August 30 || @ Braves || 9–2  || Hernández (8–12) || Jurrjens (13–6) || || 16,674 || 63–70
|- align="center" bgcolor="ffbbbb"
| 134 || August 31 || @ Braves || 3–1  || Lowe (9–12) || Lannan (8–11) || Kimbrel (41) || 20,687 || 63–71
|-

|- align="center" bgcolor="ffbbbb"
| 135 || September 1 || @ Braves || 5–2  || Hudson (14–8) || Wang (2–3) || Kimbrel (42) || 18,794 || 63–72
|- align="center" bgcolor="ffbbbb"
| 136 || September 2 || Mets || 7–3  || Dickey (7–11) || Detwiler (2–5) || || 27,907 || 63–73
|- align="center" bgcolor="bbffbb"
| 137 || September 3 || Mets || 8–7  || Burnett (5–5) || Parnell (3–5) || || 34,821 || 64–73
|- align="center" bgcolor="ffbbbb"
| 138 || September 4 || Mets || 6–3  || Igarashi (3–1) || Hernández (8–13) || Parnell (5) || 29,679 || 64–74
|- align="center" bgcolor="bbffbb"
| 139 || September 5 || Dodgers || 7–2  || Lannan (9–11) || Kuroda (11–15) || || 25,518 || 65–74
|- align="center" bgcolor="ffbbbb"
| 140 || September 6 || Dodgers || 7–3  || Jansen (2–1) || Rodríguez (3–3) || || 29,092 || 65–75
|- align="center" bgcolor="bbbbbb"
| – || September 7 || Dodgers || colspan=6| Postponed (rain) Rescheduled for September 8 as part of a doubleheader
|- align="center" bgcolor="ffbbbb"
| 141 || September 8 (1) || Dodgers || 7–4  || MacDougal (3–1) || Storen (6–3) || Guerra (16) || 21,638 || 65–76
|- align="center" bgcolor="bbbbbb"
| – || September 8 (2) || Dodgers || colspan=6| Cancelled (rain) No make-up game was scheduled
|- align="center" bgcolor="bbffbb"
| 142 || September 9 || Astros || 4–3  (11) || Clippard (3–0) || Harrell (0–1) || || 18,307 || 66–76
|- align="center" bgcolor="ffbbbb"
| 143 || September 10 || Astros || 9–3  || Rodríguez (11–10) || Lannan (9–12) || || 30,935 || 66–77
|- align="center" bgcolor="bbffbb"
| 144 || September 11 || Astros || 8–2  || Gorzelanny (3–6) || Sosa (2–4) || || 24,238 || 67–77
|- align="center" bgcolor="bbffbb"
| 145 || September 12 || @ Mets || 3–2  || Coffey (5–1) || Dickey (8–12) || Storen (35) || 27,015 || 68–77
|- align="center" bgcolor="bbffbb"
| 146 || September 13 || @ Mets || 3–2  || Stammen (1–1) || Thayer (0–2) || Storen (36) || 25,359 || 69–77
|- align="center" bgcolor="bbffbb"
| 147 || September 14 || @ Mets || 2–0  || Peacock (1–0) || Pelfrey (7–12) || Storen (37) || 26,885 || 70–77
|- align="center" bgcolor="bbffbb"
| 148 || September 15 || @ Mets || 10 – 1 || Milone (1–0) || Schwinden (0–2) || || 22,205 || 71–77
|- align="center" bgcolor="ffbbbb"
| 149 || September 16 || Marlins || 3–0  || Vázquez (11–11) || Lannan (9–13) || || 22,932 || 71–78
|- align="center" bgcolor="ffbbbb"
| 150 || September 17 || Marlins || 4–1  (13) || Hensley (5–6) || Balester (1–4) || Oviedo (36) || 33,247 || 71–79
|- align="center" bgcolor="bbffbb"
| 151 || September 18 || Marlins || 4–3  || Wang (3–3) || Hand (1–8) || Storen (38) || 26,581 || 72–79
|- align="center" bgcolor="bbffbb"
| 152 || September 20 (1) || @ Phillies || 4–3  (10) || Gorzelanny (4–6) || Stutes (6–2) || Storen (39) || 44,263 || 73–79
|- align="center" bgcolor="bbffbb"
| 153 || September 20 (2) || @ Phillies || 3–0  || Detwiler (3–5) || Lee (16–8) || Storen (40) || 45,408 || 74–79
|- align="center" bgcolor="bbffbb"
| 154 || September 21 || @ Phillies || 7–5  || Lannan (10–13) || Worley (11–3) || Rodríguez (1) || 45,083 || 75–79
|- align="center" bgcolor="bbffbb"
| 155 || September 22 || @ Phillies || 6–1  || Peacock (2–0) || Oswalt (8–10) || || 45,064 || 76–79
|- align="center" bgcolor="ffbbbb"
| 156 || September 23 || Braves || 7–4  || Hudson (16–10) || Strasburg (0–1) || Kimbrel (46) || 28,817 || 76–80
|- align="center" bgcolor="bbffbb"
| 157 || September 24 || Braves || 4–1  || Wang (4–3) || Beachy (7–3) || Storen (41) || 33,986 || 77–80
|- align="center" bgcolor="bbffbb"
| 158 || September 25 || Braves || 3–0  || Detwiler (4–5) || Minor (5–3) || Storen (42) || 37,638 || 78–80
|- align="center" bgcolor="bbffbb"
| 159 || September 26 || @ Marlins || 6–4  || Severino (1–0) || Mujica (9–6) || Rodríguez (2) || 21,058 || 79–80
|- align="center" bgcolor="ffbbbb"
| 160 || September 27 || @ Marlins || 3–2  || Vázquez (13–11) || Slaten (0–2) || || 21,902 || 79–81
|- align="center" bgcolor="bbffbb"
| 161 || September 28 || @ Marlins || 3–1  || Strasburg (1–1) || Volstad (5–13) || Storen (43) || 34,615 || 80–81
|-

Player stats

Batting
Table is sortable.

Note: Pos = Position; G = Games played; AB = At bats; R = Runs scored; H = Hits; 2B = Doubles; 3B = Triples; HR = Home runs; RBI = Runs batted in; AVG = Batting average; SB = Stolen bases

Complete offensive statistics are available here.

Pitching

Note: Pos = Position; W = Wins; L = Losses; ERA = Earned run average; G = Games pitched; GS = Games started; SV = Saves; IP = Innings pitched; R = Runs allowed; ER = Earned runs allowed; BB = Walks allowed; K = Strikeouts

Complete pitching statistics are available here.

Team leaders

Qualifying players only.

Batting

Pitching

Awards and honors

All-Stars
 Tyler Clippard, P

Clippard threw three pitches in the 2011 Major League Baseball All-Star Game and was its winning pitcher.

Farm system

Notes

References

External links

2011 Washington Nationals Season Official Site
2011 Washington Nationals season at Baseball Reference

Washington Nationals seasons
Washington Nationals
Wash